Albany Street Historic District is a national historic district located at Cazenovia in Madison County, New York.  The district contains 68 contributing buildings.  It encompasses the central commercial district of the village and neighboring residential areas including the village green and public library.

It was added to the National Register of Historic Places in 1978.

References

Historic districts on the National Register of Historic Places in New York (state)
Italianate architecture in New York (state)
Historic districts in Madison County, New York
National Register of Historic Places in Cazenovia, New York